Uruangnirin is a minor Austronesian language spoken on the islands of Tarak and Faor in the Sebakor Bay, West Papua. Some Kalamang people from the neighboring island of Karas speak it as a second language. The languages most closely related to Uruangnirin are Onin and Sekar of the Bomberai Peninsula.

Uruangnirin is an endangered language as the younger generations of its speakers are shifting to Papuan Malay, the local lingua franca, as well as Indonesian, the standard national language.

References

Central Malayo-Polynesian languages
Languages of western New Guinea